Botn (also called Rissa-Botn) is an inland fjord in the Rissa area of the municipality of Indre Fosen in Trøndelag county, Norway.  It flows through a short, small river into the Sundsbukta, a small bay off the Trondheimsfjorden.  The village of Årnset lies on the north shore of Botn.

Hydrography and water quality
The extraordinarily shallow, narrow, and long inlet restrains the water exchange severely.  The daily tidal amplitude is in the order of centimetres, about 1/10 of the tidal amplitude of the supplying Trondheimsfjord.  The shallow river connecting Botn to the Trondheimsfjord blocks out more than half of the tidal wave, making the moon-phase driven tidal flood height cycles the primal driving force for the internal water level, with an abnormally small neap flood effect (zero has been observed during lowest neap tides and meteorologically suppressed sea level).

In addition, the inlet is connected to a secluded bay sheltered from the strong tidal currents in the main fjord. As another unusual anomaly, this hydrographic blocking of seawater seems to persist in calm periods even in the winter, denying import of the usual winterly bottom water renewal that otherwise is normal in fjords, and leading to a decrease in Botn's deep water oxygen levels during winter.

With a gradually descending bottom slope beneath the inlet, the basin lacks strong internal thresholds (abruptly steepening slopes) that often isolates the deep of fjord basins from imported tidal currents, thus leaving the Botn basin 'hydrodynamically open' (with very weak topographical stratifications). Thus, the annually induced stagnation depth varies with the volume and energy of the tidal instream in the critical time when the spring flood dilutes the incoming water rapidly, and accumulating differences along the current shear creates the stratification. Naturally there is also a bottom water stratification between semi-ventilated deep water (uninhabitable but not rotten) and totally isolated poisonous bottom water.

The long and 'river-like' inlet with streaming water makes ideal growing conditions for seaweed and mussels, which was scraped for use as angling bait up until the end of World War II. Late in the 1970s, increasing agricultural eutrophication and further reduced water exchange from the growing mussel banks in the inlet led Botn to an ecological crisis with surface algal blooms and lifting of very poisonous rotten bottom water.

The Great Quick Clay Slide of 1978
On 29 April 1978, a big quick clay slide eradicated several farms on the southeast corner of Botn, killing only one person. Many inhabitants fled from the scene as the edge ate its way inward from the shore. Two local teenagers made a famous 8 mm film of the cracking, sliding, and collapsing of the clay landscape.

See also
List of lakes in Norway

References

Indre Fosen
Lakes of Trøndelag